The 1901 Tulane Olive and Blue football team represented Tulane University during the 1901 Southern Intercollegiate Athletic Association football season. The season's edition of the Battle for the Rag against LSU was originally a 22-0 victory for Tulane. The LSU Tigers protested the game to the Southern Intercollegiate Athletic Association (SIAA), and alleged that Tulane had used a professional player during the game. Several months later, the SIAA ruled the game an 11–0 forfeit in favor of LSU.

Schedule

References

Tulane
Tulane Green Wave football seasons
Tulane Olive and Blue football